42P/Neujmin, also known as Neujmin 3, is a periodic comet 2 km in diameter.

This comet and 53P/Van Biesbroeck are fragments of a parent comet that split in March 1845.

The comet did not come within 1 AU of a planet in the 20th century, but will pass 0.04 AU from asteroid 4 Vesta on July 17, 2036.

The comet nucleus is estimated to be 2.2 kilometers in diameter.

References

External links 
 Orbital simulation from JPL (Java) / Horizons Ephemeris
 42P at Kronk's Cometography

Periodic comets
0042
Comets in 2015
19290802